The Island of the Lost (German: Die Insel der Verschollenen) is a 1921 German silent science fiction film directed by Urban Gad and starring Alf Blütecher, Hanni Weisse and Erich Kaiser-Titz. It is a loose unauthorized adaptation of the 1896 novel The Island of Doctor Moreau by H. G. Wells. Author Wells was allegedly unaware that this unauthorized version of his novel existed. It was a common practice in the silent era for European filmmakers to produce unauthorized versions of famous works of literature, as evidenced by F. W. Murnau's Der Januskopf(1920) (based upon Robert Louis Stevenson's  Dr. Jekyll and Mr. Hyde) and Nosferatu (1922) (based upon Bram Stoker's Dracula).

Thought at one time to have been lost, a print has turned up at the Bundesarchiv in Berlin, Germany. The film was only screened in the US for the first time at a "Monster Bash" convention in 2014. Comments from the attendees included the fact that the film was somewhat illogical, and had more emphasis on comedy and romance than horror, but that it offered "memorable glimpses of human-animal hybrids".

Director Gad began his film directing career in his native Denmark where he met and married actress Asta Nielsen, but later they both moved to Germany where he had a successful filmmaking career that lasted until 1927. The film's sets were designed by the art director Robert A. Dietrich. The Wells novel was adapted earlier in 1913 as a silent film called The Island of Terror.

Plot
Dr. Marston leads a small party to a deserted island in the South Seas where they discover a hidden research facility run by a Professor McClelland. The scientist is experimenting with mixing the DNA of animals and humans, with frightening results.

Cast
In alphabetical order
Fritz Beckmann as Jim 
Hans Behrendt as Pat Quickly 
Alf Blütecher as Robert Marston
Louis Brody 
Tronier Funder as Dr. Ted Fowlen 
Umberto Guarracino as product from the Professor's secret workshop
Ludmilla Hell as Evelyn Wilkinson 
Erich Kaiser-Titz as Professor McClelland 
Nien Tso Ling as Fung-Lu 
Hermann Picha as Jess 
Desdemona Schlichting as last survivor
Hanni Weisse as Jane Crawford

References

External links

Films of the Weimar Republic
Films directed by Urban Gad
German silent feature films
1920s science fiction films
German science fiction films
Terra Film films
German black-and-white films
1920s rediscovered films
The Island of Doctor Moreau
Films based on works by H. G. Wells
Rediscovered German films
1920s German films
1920s German-language films
Silent science fiction films